Michael Fischer may refer to:

 Michael J. Fischer (born 1942), computer scientist
 Michael M. J. Fischer, professor of anthropology
 Mike Fischer (active from 1973), British physicist and businessman

See also
 Michael Fisher (disambiguation)